Chazeauiana is  a genus of beetle in the family Coccinellidae, formerly included within the genus Epilachna.

Selected species
 Chazeauiana consignata (Weise, 1909)
 Chazeauiana coquereli (Sicard, 1907)
 Chazeauiana fulvohirta (Weise, 1895)
 Chazeauiana griveaudi (Chazeau, 1975)
 Chazeauiana gyldenstolpei (Weise, 1924)
 Chazeauiana nigrolimbata (Thomson, 1875)
 Chazeauiana vadoni (Chazeau, 1976)

References

Coccinellidae
Coccinellidae genera